The East Side Kids were characters in a series of 22 films released by Monogram Pictures from 1940 through 1945.  Many of them were originally part of The Dead End Kids and The Little Tough Guys, and several of them later became members of The Bowery Boys.

History

When Samuel Goldwyn turned the play Dead End into the 1937 film version, he recruited the original tough-talking kids from the play (Leo Gorcey, Huntz Hall, Bobby Jordan, Gabriel Dell, Billy Halop, and Bernard Punsly) to repeat their roles in the film. This led to the making of six other films starring The Dead End Kids. The most successful of these features were Angels with Dirty Faces (1938) with James Cagney and Humphrey Bogart, and They Made Me a Criminal (1939), starring John Garfield. Universal offered a competing series, under the Little Tough Guys brand name, later combining the Little Tough Guys cast members with the Dead End Kids (minus Gorcey) as the Dead End Kids and Little Tough Guys series.

The East Side Kids
In 1940 producer Sam Katzman, noting the financial success of other tough-kid series,  made the film East Side Kids using two of the 'Little Tough Guys', Hally Chester and Harris Berger. He added former Our Gang player Donald Haines, Frankie Burke, radio actor Sam Edwards, and Eddie Brian to round out the new team. The film served as a kind of "pilot" for a possible series of films, which were eventually made possible by this film's success.

Katzman hired former Dead End Kid Bobby Jordan to play the lead in the first film in the series proper, Boys of the City and he was soon joined in the series by Leo Gorcey. Gorcey's brother David was also added, as well as (Ernie) 'Sunshine' Sammy Morrison as "Scruno," the only African-American in the group and a former child actor from the very first cast of the Our Gang comedy team.

In the first few films, Dave O'Brien (familiar from low-budget westerns and serials, and as the accident-prone star of the Pete Smith comedies) played Jordan's older brother Knuckles Dolan, who always seemed to be getting roped into chaperoning the kids from adventure to adventure. O'Brien appeared in different roles as well—continuity between films was often ignored. As with the Little Tough Guys, the membership of the team changed from film to film, until Huntz Hall joined in 1941, when the lineup was somewhat stabilized. In total, 20 actors were members of the team at one time or another.

Always the outsider, Gabriel Dell drifted in and out of the series as a gang-member, a reporter, or a small-time hoodlum (as in Million Dollar Kid). In Smart Alecks he's an ex-member who left the gang to pursue a life of crime. Stanley Clements also appeared in Smart Alecks as well as 'Neath Brooklyn Bridge and Ghosts on the Loose. After Gorcey left the subsequent "Bowery Boys" series in 1956, Clements was chosen to replace him in the last seven films.

Monogram (which later became Allied Artists) was notorious for its "Poverty Row" productions, and the East Side films were no exception. With a minuscule budget of around $33,000 per feature and a tight shooting schedule of only 5–7 days, the series churned out three or four movies a year (an astonishing 21 films in less than six years). There was no time or money for subtlety, story development, or more than one or two takes per scene.

The stories always centered on the tough, pugnacious "Muggs McGinnis" (Gorcey) or the more innocent, clean-cut "Danny" (Bobby Jordan). Huntz Hall's "Glimpy" began as a minor character who grew in prominence as he was given a larger comedic role over the course of the series. The loose format proved flexible enough to shift back and forth between urban drama (That Gang of Mine), murder mystery (Boys of the City), boxing melodrama (Bowery Blitzkrieg), and horror-comedy (Spooks Run Wild), with the kids confronting various stock villains: gangsters, smugglers, spies, and crooked gamblers, along the way. The East Side films were problem-teen melodramas until 1943, when director William Beaudine joined the series and emphasized the comedy content. He encouraged the actors to improvise freely, adding to the films' spontaneous charm.

The contemporaneous events of World War II affected the series as well as the cast.  In 1943 Bela Lugosi (who was in Spooks Run Wild) returned as a Nazi saboteur in the incongruously-titled Ghosts on the Loose which also featured a young Ava Gardner; a German-Japanese spy ring was thwarted in the blatantly patriotic Let's Get Tough! from 1942 (with Gabriel Dell, of all people, as a Nazi spy). At the end of Kid Dynamite Muggs, Danny, and Glimpy enlist and show off their uniforms. In Follow the Leader (1944), Muggs and Glimpy appear in uniform as they are on leave from the Army. Offscreen, between 1942 and 1944, cast members Billy Benedict, Morrison, Jordan, Dell, and David Gorcey left the series after being drafted. A few days after receiving his induction notice, Leo Gorcey suffered a near-fatal motorcycle accident and spent almost a year in recovery. His injuries led to a 4-F classification, rendering him unfit for military service.

During Bobby Jordan's absence, his role in the series was taken by former child actor David Durand. Durand had been the star of Columbia's series of "Glove Slingers" campus comedies, and lent the same earnest sincerity to his East Side Kids appearances. (Jordan returned in 1944, in uniform, for a guest appearance in Bowery Champs.)

Starting with Clancy Street Boys in 1943, Bernard Gorcey (Leo's father) did various bit parts, playing different characters in a total of seven films. In Million Dollar Kid he and Leo exchanged banter borrowed from an Abbott and Costello routine. He later became a fixture with The Bowery Boys.

Given the low budgets, simplistic stories, and crude, assembly-line production of the East Side Kids series, its enduring popularity relies on the cast's rambunctious energy, breezy banter (often ad-libbed and containing inside jokes), fast-paced action, and Leo Gorcey's trademark malapropisms ("This calls for drastic measurements").

The East Side Kids series was supplanted by The Bowery Boys in 1946.

List of East Side Kids

 Leo Gorcey as Ethelbert 'Muggs' (or 'Mugs') McGinnis (Maloney in early films) (1940–1945)
 Huntz Hall as Glimpy (Limpy in Bowery Blitzkrieg) (1941–1945)
 Bobby Jordan as Danny (1940–1943) and Bobby (1944)
 Gabriel Dell as Various characters (1942–1945)
 "Sunshine Sammy" Morrison as Scruno (1940–1944)
 William Benedict as Skinny and others (1943-1945)
 David Gorcey as Pete in Boys of the City (1940) and Peewee (1940–1942)
 Donald Haines as Peewee in East Side Kids and Boys of the City (both 1940) and Skinny (1940–1941)
 Stanley Clements as Stash (1942–1943)
 Bobby Stone as Various characters (1940–1944)
 Dave Durand as Skinny in Kid Dynamite (1943) and Danny (1943-1944)
 Johnny Duncan as Various characters (1944–1945)
 Eugene Francis as Algernon 'Algy' Wilkes (1940–1941)
 Buddy Gorman as Various characters (1943–1945)
 Jimmy Strand as Various characters (1943–1945)
 Mende Koenig as Various characters (1945)
 Hally Chester as Fred 'Dutch' Kuhn in East Side Kids and Buster in Boys of the City (both 1940)
 Frankie Burke as Skinny in East Side Kids and Boys of the City (both 1940)
 Bennie Bartlett as Beanie (or Benny) in Kid Dynamite and Clancy Street Boys (both 1943)
 Harris Berger as Danny in the East Side Kids pilot (1940)
 Eddie Brian as Mike in the East Side Kids pilot (1940)
 Jack Edwards as Algernon 'Mouse' Wilkes in the East Side Kids pilot (1940)
 Sam Edwards as Pete in the East Side Kids pilot (1940)
 Bill Lawrence as Skinny in Mr. Wise Guy (1942)
 Dick Chandlee as Skinny (a.k.a. 'Stash') in Clancy Street Boys (1943)
 Eddie Mills as Dave in Clancy Street Boys (1943)
 Bill Bates as Dave (a.k.a. 'Sleepy') in Ghosts on the Loose (1943)
 Al Stone as Herbie in Million Dollar Kid (1944)
 Bill Chaney as Tobey in Block Busters (1944)
 Leo Borden as Pete (a.k.a. 'Aristotles') in Docks of New York (1945)

Filmography

Re-releases
Many of the East Side Kids programs were re-released by Astor Pictures, Favorite Films, and Savoy Pictures Corporation, the latter two companies owned by former Monogram executives

See also 
 Dead End Kids
 Little Tough Guys
 The Bowery Boys

References

External links 

 
 
 
 
 
 
 
 
 
 
 
 
 
 
 
 
 
 
 
 

 
Film series introduced in 1940
American comedians
American film series
Comedy film series